Asali Solomon is an American professor, author, and novelist. She grew up in West Philadelphia, and attended Henry C. Lea Elementary, The Baldwin School in Bryn Mawr, Pennsylvania, and graduated from Central High School. In 2007, she was named a 5 under 35 honoree.

Biography
Solomon attended Barnard College as an undergraduate, and received a Ph.D. in English from UC Berkeley. After her Ph.D., she went on to receive an MFA from the University of Iowa in Fiction. She is currently an Associate Professor of English at Haverford College. Before working at Haverford, she was affiliated with Washington and Lee University and Trinity College.

Solomon has written two books. Her first, Get Down, was a collection of short stories published in 2008. She published her second book, a novel titled Disgruntled, in 2015. Disgruntled was well received by critics.

Bibliography
 Get Down (2008)
 Disgruntled (Farrar, Straus and Giroux, 2015)

References

Barnard College alumni
University of Iowa alumni
The Baldwin School alumni
Rona Jaffe Foundation Writers' Award winners
Haverford College faculty
Year of birth missing (living people)
Living people
21st-century American novelists
American women novelists
American women short story writers
Writers from Philadelphia
21st-century American women writers
21st-century American short story writers
Novelists from Pennsylvania
American women academics